Andrew Ukovic (born 23 November 1978) is a former Australian rules footballer who played with Essendon and Collingwood in the Australian Football League (AFL).

Ukovic was from West Coburg, but drafted from the Northern Knights of the TAC Cup. He played with the Essendon reserves for a year and then broke into the seniors, at the age of 18, in the 1997 AFL season. In round 16, 1999, Ukovic would claim three Brownlow votes for his performance against Essendon's premiership rivals Carlton but two rounds later injured his knee and missed the finals series.

Essendon traded him to Collingwood at the end of the season, in a three club deal from which they gained Jonathon Robran as well as the draft pick which secured ruckman David Hille. By appearing in the 2000 Anzac Day clash, Ukovic became the first footballer to play in the fixture for both Collingwood and Essendon. The following season he played only five games and was delisted.

References

1978 births
Australian rules footballers from Victoria (Australia)
Essendon Football Club players
Collingwood Football Club players
Northern Knights players
Living people